The Republic of Poland ambassador to the United Kingdom (known formally as the Ambassador Extraordinary and Plenipotentiary of the Republic of Poland to the Court of St James's) is the official representative of the Government of the Republic of Poland to the Queen and Government of the United Kingdom of Great Britain and Northern Ireland.

The main building of the embassy is located in the City of Westminster close to the Regent's Park. Moreover the Consular and Economic sections are located in the City of London on Bouverie Street. In addition there are Consulates General located in Belfast, Edinburgh and Manchester.

History 
The first permanent Polish diplomatic mission was created in late 18th century by the last King of Poland, Stanislaus Augustus. After partitions of Poland, there was over a century gap in diplomatic relations. The mission was re-established following Poland regaining independence in the aftermath of World War I.

Ambassadors of Poland to the Court of St James's

Polish-Lithuanian Commonwealth
 1553 Thomas Stafford
 1763 Józef Poniński
 1766–1768 General Charles Lee
 1769–1772 Tadeusz Burzyński
 1772–1785 Franciszek Bukaty
Note: Military Partitions of Poland ended the existence of a sovereign Polish state for over a century.

Second Polish Republic
Note: Second Republic was created in 1918.
 1918–1919 Władysław Sobański (Delegate of the Polish National Committee)
 1919–1920 Eustachy Sapieha (Envoy)
 1920–1921 Jan Ciechanowski (Chargé d'Affaires a.i.)
 1921–1922 Władysław Wróblewski (Envoy)
 1922–1929 Konstanty Skirmunt (Envoy)
 1929–1934 Konstanty Skirmunt (Ambassador)
 1934–1945 Edward Raczyński
Note: Edward Raczyński was the ambassador of the Polish government-in-exile to United Kingdom from 1939 until 1945.

Polish People's Republic
Note: Officially, Polish People's Republic is the name used since 1952. Unofficially, this name is used for all Polish communist governments since 1944.
 1945–1949 Henryk Strasburger
 1949–1953 Jerzy Michałowski
 1953–1956 Eugeniusz Milnikiel
 1960–1964 Witold Rodziński
 1964–1969 Jerzy Morawski
 1969–1972 Marian Dobrosielski
 1972–1978 Artur Starewicz
 1978–1983 Jan Bisztyga
 1987–1990 Zbigniew Gertych

Third Polish Republic
Note: modern Poland.
 1990–1993 Tadeusz de Virion
 1994–1999 Ryszard Stemplowski
 1999–2004 Stanisław Komorowski
 2004–2006 Zbigniew Matuszewski
 2006–2012 Barbara Tuge-Erecińska 
 2012–2016 Witold Sobków 
 2016–2021 Arkady Rzegocki
 since 2022 Piotr Wilczek

See also
List of ambassadors from the United Kingdom to Poland
Poland–United Kingdom relations

References

 
United Kingdom
Poland